Levon Aghababyan ( 1887–1915) was an Armenian mathematician, headmaster of high schools in Kütahya and Akşehir (1908–14), directed his own school in Kütahya for three years.

Biography 
Levon was born in 1887 in Baghesh and graduated from the Sanasaryan College. From 1908 to 1914 he was first a teacher then a headmaster at the national colleges of Akshehir and Kutahya. He was a teacher of mathematics, opened a private school in Kutahya. The school existed for only three years. He also was an editor of the weekly Azatamart. He was a victim of the Armenian genocide.

References

1887 births
1915 deaths
20th-century Armenian mathematicians
People from Bitlis
People who died in the Armenian genocide
Mathematicians from the Ottoman Empire
Armenians from the Ottoman Empire